Daniel Meserve Durell (July 20, 1769 – April 29, 1841) was an American attorney and Democratic-Republican politician in the U.S. state of New Hampshire. He served as a member of the United States House of Representatives and as a member of the New Hampshire House of Representatives in the early 1800s.

Early life and career
Durell was born in Lee in the Province of New Hampshire, the son of Nicholas and Abigail Durell. He attended Phillips Exeter Academy, and graduated from Dartmouth College in 1794. He studied law, was admitted to the bar in 1797, and began practicing law in Dover, New Hampshire.

He was elected as a Democratic-Republican to the Tenth Congress, serving from March 4, 1807 – March 3, 1809. He served as a member of the New Hampshire House of Representatives in 1816. He was Chief Justice of the district court of common pleas from 1816–1821, and United States attorney for the district of New Hampshire from 1830–1834.

Following his years of public service, Durell resumed the practice of law. He died in Dover on April 29, 1841, and is interred in Pine Hill Cemetery.

Personal life
Durell married Elizabeth Wentworth on June 1, 1800. They had several children including Mary Jane Durell, Sarah Adeline Durell, Elizabeth Salter Durell, Nicholas St. John Durell, Charles James Fix Durell, Margarett Ann Durell, Edward Henry Durell and George Clinton Durell.

References

Further reading
 "The bench and bar of New Hampshire: including biographical notices of deceased judges of the highest court, and lawyers of the province and state, and a list of names of those now living" by Charles Henry Bell, published by Houghton, Mifflin and Company, 1893.

External links
 	

	

1769 births
1841 deaths
Members of the New Hampshire House of Representatives
Dartmouth College alumni
Democratic-Republican Party members of the United States House of Representatives from New Hampshire
United States Attorneys for the District of New Hampshire
Phillips Exeter Academy alumni
People from Lee, New Hampshire